John Lovelady is an American puppeteer who worked with the Muppets, including on the PBS series Sesame Street. Lovelady is originally from Oxford, Mississippi. He was one of the puppeteer troupe in the first season of The Muppet Show (1976–77).

He later joined the syndicated children's series The Great Space Coaster, puppeteered for Mother Goose's Treasury, and also performed in a serialisation of Alice's Adventures in Wonderland.

Filmography
 The Great Santa Claus Switch - Bong, Scoff, Additional Muppets
 The Frog Prince (Muppets) - Additional Muppets
 The Muppet Musicians of Bremen - Additional Muppets
 The Muppets Valentine Show - Crazy Donald, Additional Muppets
 The Muppet Show: Sex and Violence - Abraham Lincoln, Vanity, Additional Muppets
 The Muppet Show - Crazy Harry, Nigel, Svengali (episode 103), Iggy Wiggy, Additional Muppets
 Adventures in Wonderland (Disney): The Dormouse
 Dumbo's Circus (Disney): Flap
 D.C. Follies (syndicated): Ronald Reagan
 Mr. Smith (NBC): Mr. Smith
 The Great Space Coaster (syndicated): Edison The Elephant, Knock Knock the Woodpecker (Seasons 1, 2, 3)

References

External links

American puppeteers
Muppet performers
Sesame Street Muppeteers
Living people
People from Oxford, Mississippi
1931 births